The 2017–18 season is Vitosha Bistritsa's first season in the Bulgarian First League after they won 1-0 the play-off promotion/relegation match against Neftochimic Burgas on June 3, 2017, on Trace Arena in Stara Zagora. Paul Otofe scored the most important goal in the club's history.

Squad

Fixtures

Regular season

Table

Relegation stage

Table

Relegation play-offs

Bulgarian Cup

Squad statistics 

|-
|colspan="14"|Players away from the club on loan:

|-
|colspan="14"|Players who left Vitosha Bistritsa during the season:

|}

References 

Vitosha
FC Vitosha Bistritsa seasons